Lake Agassiz Peatlands Natural Area is a  National Natural Landmark located in Koochiching County, Minnesota.  Designated in November 1965 under the Historic Sites Act, its ownership and oversight are provided by the National Park Service of the United States.  This designation from the United States Secretary of the Interior, gives it recognition as an outstanding example of the nation's natural history.  The designation describes it as
An example of the extensive peatlands occupying the bed of ancient glacial Lake Agassiz, illustrating the process of peat accumulation over about 11,000 years. The area contains Myrtle Lake Bog, which developed contrary to the usual successional process of lake filling, and is an excellent example of both raised and string bogs.

References

External links
Official website

Protected areas of Koochiching County, Minnesota
National Natural Landmarks in Minnesota
Wilderness areas of Minnesota